Pedro Álvaro Santos de Lima (born 29 June 1983 in Riachão do Jacuípe, Bahia) is a Brazilian amateur boxer best known to win the 2007 PanAm welterweight (152 lbs) title in 2007.

Career
Lima fought in his home country and beat Jaime Cortez, ECU, 13-3,  Ricardo Smith, JAM, 12-4, and US southpaw Demetrius Andrade who became world champion later that year in the finals 7-6.
He was the first boxing gold medalist for Brazil in 44 years.

At the world championships he beat Ergazy Murzakarimov (Kirgizia) 21-9, and Polish Michal Starbala 12-8  but lost to Bakhyt Sarsekbayev and did not qualify (yet) for the Olympics.

At the first Olympic qualifier he was upset by unknown John Jackson, at the second he was again upset by a completely unknown in Tureano Johnson.

Professional boxing record 

| style="text-align:center;" colspan="8"|3 Wins (3 decisions),  0 Losses, 0 Draws
|-  style="text-align:center; background:#e3e3e3;"
|  style="border-style:none none solid solid; "|Res.
|  style="border-style:none none solid solid; "|Record
|  style="border-style:none none solid solid; "|Opponent
|  style="border-style:none none solid solid; "|Type
|  style="border-style:none none solid solid; "|Rd., Time
|  style="border-style:none none solid solid; "|Date
|  style="border-style:none none solid solid; "|Location
|  style="border-style:none none solid solid; "|Notes
|- align=center
|Win||1–0
|align=left| Bryan de Oliveira
|
|
|
|align=left|
|align=left|

References

External links
Results, PanAm Games

Welterweight boxers
Living people
1983 births
Boxers at the 2007 Pan American Games
Brazilian male boxers
Pan American Games gold medalists for Brazil
Pan American Games medalists in boxing
Medalists at the 2007 Pan American Games
21st-century Brazilian people